Briel Thomas (born on 25 November 1994) is a Dominican professional footballer who plays for Trinidadian club W Connection and the Dominican national team.

International career
Thomas made his national team debut on 30 November 2013 in a 1–0 friendly loss to Saint Lucia. On 6 July 2017, he scored his first goal for Dominica, the tying goal in a 2–2 draw against Saint Vincent and the Grenadines.

Career statistics

International goals
Scores and results list Dominica's goal tally first.

References

1994 births
Living people
Association football midfielders
Dominica footballers
People from Saint Peter Parish, Dominica
Dominica expatriate footballers
Expatriate footballers in Trinidad and Tobago
W Connection F.C. players
TT Pro League players
Dominica international footballers